KWBW (1450 kHz) is a commercial AM radio station licensed to Hutchinson, Kansas, and serving Reno County.  The station has a talk radio format and is owned by Eagle Communications.

KWBW is powered at 1,000 watts.  Programming is simulcast on FM translator K253BP at 98.5 MHz.

Programming
KWBW has local news, talk and farm reports on weekday mornings and an hour of news at noon and at 5 p.m.  A tradio program, called the BW Party Line, airs at 10 a.m.  The rest of the weekday schedule is made up of nationally syndicated conservative talk show hosts:  Glenn Beck, Bill O'Reilly, Dave Ramsey, Ben Shapiro, Dennis Prager, Sebastian Gorka and America In The Morning.  World and national news is provided by CBS Radio News. KWBW is also a Kansas City Chiefs and Kansas City Royals affiliate.

Weekends feature shows on home improvement, gardening, cars, pets, technology and religion.  Weekend syndicated hosts include Kim Komando, Gordon Deal and Bill Cunningham.  Some weekend hours feature the CBS Sports Radio Network.  KWBW also broadcasts Hutchinson high school football and basketball games.

History
On May 28, 1935, KWBW first signed on the air.  It was the first radio station to serve the Hutchinson area and featured programming from the NBC Red Network.  During the "Golden Age of Radio," KWBW carried NBC dramas, comedies, news, sports, game shows, soap operas and big band broadcasts.

In the 1950s, as network programming moved to TV, KWBW switched to a middle of the road format of popular music, news, talk and sports.  Over time, as more music listening shifted to FM, KWBW reduced music and increased talk until it made the transition to talk radio.

In 2013, KWBW launched an FM translator at 98.5 MHz for listeners who prefer listening on the FM band.

References

External links

WBW
Talk radio stations in the United States
Radio stations established in 1973
CBS Sports Radio stations
1973 establishments in Kansas